Firuza Alifova is a Tajikistani singer. She represented Tajikistan at the Astana 2006 international contest. She was born in Dushanbe.

References

External links
Astana 2006 - Firuza Alifova
Some of her video clips on Youtube

21st-century Tajikistani women singers
Living people
People from Dushanbe
Year of birth missing (living people)